The 19th Commonwealth of Independent States Cup was the nineteenth edition of the competition between the champions of former republics of Soviet Union. It took place in Saint Petersburg between 15 and 23 January 2011 and was won by Inter Baku.

This was the last edition of the Cup as a club tournament, before the format was changed to a youth national teams event in 2012.

Participants

 1 Zenit Saint Petersburg were represented by its reserve (U21) squad.
 2 Dynamo Kyiv were represented by their reserve team Dynamo-2 Kyiv. They replaced Shakhtar Donetsk (2009–10 Ukrainian champions), who refused to participate.
 3 Shakhtyor Soligorsk replaced BATE Borisov (2010 Belarusian champions), who refused to participate.
 4 Iskra-Stal Rîbnița replaced Sheriff Tiraspol (2009–10 Moldovan champions), who refused to participate.
 5 Mika Yerevan replaced Pyunik Yerevan (2010 Armenian champions), who refused to participate.
 6 HJK Helsinki invited by the organizing committee to replace  Olimpi Rustavi (2009–10 Georgian champions), who declined to participate along with other Georgian teams due to 2008 South Ossetian War.

Group stage

Group A

Results

Group B

Results

Group C

Results

Group D

Results

Final rounds

Bracket

Quarterfinals

Semifinals

Final

Top scorers

References

External links 
 Russian Football Union Official web-site 
 Commonwealth of Independent States Cup 2011 at rsssf
 2011 CIS Cup at kick-off.by

2010–11 in Russian football
2010–11 in Ukrainian football
2011 in Saint Petersburg
January 2011 sports events in Russia
2011